Karl Markus Alfred Allard (born 3 January 1990) is a Swedish politician, journalist and columnist, serving as leader of the Örebro Party since its inception in 2014. Since the general election in 2018, he is a municipal commissioner and one of two members from the Örebro Party in the Örebro municipal assembly, along with the former policeman Peter Springare. Allard writes columns for the blog Ledarsidorna, and has previously worked as a journalist for the online newspaper Nyheter Idag.

He has a podcast with writer Malcom Kyeyune.

Biography 

From 2009 to 2013, Allard was chairman of the Young Left's district organisation in Örebro. He worked for the election campaign of Oumar Mariko in Mali during the 2012 Malian coup d'état.

Markus Allard is the grandson of the Social Democratic politician and speaker of the Riksdag Henry Allard.

References 

1990 births
Living people
21st-century Swedish politicians
21st-century Swedish journalists
Swedish people of Walloon descent